Arrechea or Arretxea is a Basque surname. Notable people with this surname include:

 Alexandre Arrechea (born 1970), Cuban artist
 Carlos Arrechea (born 1990), Cuban actor
 Hernando Arrechea (born 1943-2009 died), Colombian hurdler
 Yovanny Arrechea (born 1983), Colombian footballer